Rodent to Stardom is a 1967 Warner Bros. Looney Tunes cartoon directed by Alex Lovy. The short was released on September 23, 1967, and stars Daffy Duck and Speedy Gonzales. It is the first cartoon to credit Warner Bros.-Seven Arts, but still uses the "Abstract WB" titles.

Plot
Daffy is plucked for stardom by director Harvey Hassenpfeffer of Colossal Studios — or so he thinks. However, as he was in A Star Is Bored (1956), Daffy's real fate is to be the stuntman for the star, in this case Speedy Gonzales. The picture is The Nursery Rhyme Review. First, "the sky is falling"; next, the "rockabye baby" cradle falls from a treetop. Daffy realizes he needs to get rid of Speedy, so he asks for an autograph and traps Speedy in a book, which he deposits in a library. Daffy gets the love scene with Ducky Lamour, but after a number of stunts and just before the kiss, his stand-in, Speedy, takes over. "There's no business like show business, eh, Señores Daffy?" Speedy said. "Boy, you can say that again!" Daffy replied in disgust, as he watches Speedy kissing Ducky on the cheek.

References

External links
 

1967 films
Looney Tunes shorts
1960s American animated films
Films scored by William Lava
1967 animated films
1967 short films
1960s Warner Bros. animated short films
Daffy Duck films
Speedy Gonzales films
Animated films about mice
Films directed by Alex Lovy
1960s English-language films